Tervel Peak is a triple peak rising to 810 m in Friesland Ridge, Tangra Mountains on Livingston Island in the South Shetland Islands, Antarctica overlooking Peshtera Glacier and Zagore Beach to the northwest, and Charity Glacier to the southwest.  Linked by Pleven Saddle to MacKay Peak in the west-southwest.

The peaks are named after Khan Tervel of Bulgaria who stopped the Arab invasion of Europe in 718 AD.

Location

Maps
 South Shetland Islands. Scale 1:200000 topographic map No. 5657. DOS 610 – W 62 60. Tolworth, UK, 1968.
 Islas Livingston y Decepción.  Mapa topográfico a escala 1:100000.  Madrid: Servicio Geográfico del Ejército, 1991.
 S. Soccol, D. Gildea and J. Bath. Livingston Island, Antarctica. Scale 1:100000 satellite map. The Omega Foundation, USA, 2004.
 L.L. Ivanov et al., Antarctica: Livingston Island and Greenwich Island, South Shetland Islands (from English Strait to Morton Strait, with illustrations and ice-cover distribution), 1:100000 scale topographic map, Antarctic Place-names Commission of Bulgaria, Sofia, 2005
 L.L. Ivanov. Antarctica: Livingston Island and Greenwich, Robert, Snow and Smith Islands. Scale 1:120000 topographic map. Troyan: Manfred Wörner Foundation, 2010.  (First edition 2009. )
 Antarctic Digital Database (ADD). Scale 1:250000 topographic map of Antarctica. Scientific Committee on Antarctic Research (SCAR). Since 1993, regularly upgraded and updated.
 L.L. Ivanov. Antarctica: Livingston Island and Smith Island. Scale 1:100000 topographic map. Manfred Wörner Foundation, 2017.

References
 Tervel Peak. SCAR Composite Gazetteer of Antarctica
 Bulgarian Antarctic Gazetteer. Antarctic Place-names Commission. (details in Bulgarian, basic data in English)

External links
 Tervel Peak. Copernix satellite image

Tangra Mountains